Filip Karađorđević (born 15 January 1982), known in English as Prince Philip Karageorgevitch and unofficially titled Philip, Hereditary Prince of Serbia and Yugoslavia, is a Serbian business manager, a member of the House of Karađorđević, and heir apparent to Crown Prince Alexander. He is the second grandson of the last King of Yugoslavia, Peter II.

Born in the United States and raised in the United Kingdom, he shaped into a finance and asset manager. In 2020, he moved to his homeland Serbia and took more active role in public life, traveling often across Serbia, Kosovo, Montenegro, and Republika Srpska. His son is the first male child born to the Karađorđević royal family on Serbian soil for 90 years. In 2022, he became the hereditary prince, following his elder brother's renunciation.

Early life and education
Born in 1982, Philip is the second son and second child of the last Crown Prince of the former Kingdom of Yugoslavia, Alexander, and Princess Maria da Gloria of Orléans-Braganza. He is the fraternal twin of Alexander. His godparents are Queen Sofía of Spain, King Constantine II of Greece (both first cousins of his paternal grandmother), and Princess Anne, Duchess of Calabria (first cousin of his mother). Besides the twin brother, he has the older brother, Peter (b. 1980). Philip lived in Virginia until 1984. In 1982, Philip and his twin brother were baptized by Lavrentije, Serbian Orthodox Bishop of Western Europe, at a castle in Villamanrique de la Condesa, near Seville, Spain.

Philip's parents divorced in 1985. After the divorce, his father remarried Katherine Clairy Batis later that year, while his mother remarried Ignacio, Duke of Segorbe later that year also. Through his mother, Philip has two younger half-sisters, Sol María de la Blanca Medina y Orléans-Braganza, 54th Countess of Ampurias (b. 1986) and Ana Luna Medina y Orléans-Braganza, 17th Countess of Ricla (b. 1988).

Together with his twin brother, Philip was educated in London and Canterbury. In June 2000, Philip completed sixth form at The King's School, Canterbury having obtained three A levels and ten GCSEs. He was awarded a BA from University College London at the completion of his university studies. In 2003–04, he joined a student exchange program at a university in Madrid. Also, he finished École hôtelière de Lausanne in Switzerland.

In 1991, Philip with his father and brothers briefly visited Belgrade, Yugoslavia. In February 2001, the Parliament of FR Yugoslavia passed legislation conferring citizenship on members of the Karađorđević family, making Philip eligible for a Yugoslav citizenship. In July 2001, his father and step-mother moved to Belgrade, Serbia, FR Yugoslavia. After the dissolution of FR Yugoslavia (later renamed to Serbia and Montenegro), Philip obtained a citizenship of Serbia.

Personal life 
After completion of his studies, Philip started to work for financial institutions located in the City of London. There he worked as finance manager for Landsbanki and Teather & Greenwood. Then, he worked in the Ritz Hotel in London. Afterwards, he worked for Cyprus-based global hedge fund IKOS. Most recently, Philip has been working with a renowned global asset manager in London. Philip lived and worked in London until 2020 when he relocated to Serbia and started to work remotely, following COVID-19 pandemic in Europe.

Philip completed the 2010 Athens Marathon, the 2011 Belgrade Half-marathon, and the 2014 London Marathon.

Marriage and issue 
On 24 July 2017, his engagement to Danica Marinković was announced.

Philip married Danica Marinković on 7 October 2017, at the Cathedral Church of Saint Michael the Archangel in Belgrade, Serbia. Their witnesses were Victoria, Crown Princess of Sweden and his brother Peter. His two godmothers, Queen Sofía of Spain and Princess Anne, Duchess of Calabria attended the wedding. It was the first royal wedding in Serbia since 1922 and the wedding of his great-grandfather King Alexander I and Princess Maria of Romania. Several members of European royal families also attended, including Prince Guillaume of Luxembourg with his wife, Prince Amyn Aga Khan, Princess Jeet Nabha Khemka, and guests of the Karađorđević Royal Family and the Marinković family, including president of the National Assembly of Serbia Maja Gojković among others.

Princess Danica gave birth to their son, Prince Stephen, in Belgrade on 25 February 2018, at 10:30 am. Stephen is the first male child born to the royal family on Serbian soil for 90 years, the last such birth being that of Prince Tomislav in Belgrade in 1928. Stephen was baptized on December 15, 2018, at the Royal Palace's Chapel in Belgrade.

Public life 
Prince Philip attended the reburial of his grandparents King Peter II and Queen Alexandra, grand-grandmother Queen Maria, and granduncle Prince Andrew in the Royal Family Mausoleum at Oplenac on 26 May 2013. The Serbian Royal Regalia were placed over King Peter's coffin, having Philip placing the Royal Orb and Sceptre near to the Karađorđević Crown.

On 17 July 2015, Prince Philip and his brothers were present at their father's 70th birthday celebration in Royal Compound, Belgrade. The event gathered 400 guests, including Carl XVI Gustaf of Sweden and Albert II of Monaco among others.

Prince in Serbia (2020–2022) 
Philip used to lived in London with his family, a wife and a son, but as of July 2020 they relocated and currently live in Belgrade, Serbia. With his relocation to Serbia, Philip fulfilled the promise he gave to Serbian Patriarch Irinej to do so.

In January 2020, Prince Philip had voiced support for the clerical protests in Montenegro.

On 22 November 2020, Philip and his wife Princess Danica were the only members of the House of Karađorđević who attended the funeral service of Patriarch Irinej at the Church of Saint Sava. Prince Philip and his wife were also the only members of the House of Karađorđević who attended enthronement of newly elected Patriarch Porfirije  on 19 February 2021 in St. Michael's Cathedral in Belgrade.

In April 2021 before the Easter, Philip visited Kosovo to give a support to Serbian community there, becoming also the first member of House of Karađorđević after his grand-grandfather King Alexander I who traveled to Prizren. He and his wife traveled there for a weekend visiting Orthodox Seminary, Our Lady of Ljeviš Church, Cathedral of Saint George, and Church of St. Nicholas. Also, they have visited Velika Hoča, Orahovac, and monasteries Patriarchate of Peć and Zočište during the trip.

On 13 September 2021, Philip and his wife Princess Danica attended Holy Liturgy led by Patriarch Porfirije in the Jasenovac Monastery in Croatia and visited the Jasenovac concentration camp and Stone Flower sculpture becoming first members of the House of Karađorđević who visited this memorial site from World War II.

In December 2021, Philip had voiced support for the environmental protests in Serbia.

In February 2022, Philip and his wife traveled to Han Pijesak, Bosnia and Herzegovina, where they met with local authorities and took over keys of the summer house of the Karađorđević family. The summer house was built by King Alexander I in the early 1920s and used by his family until 1941. Afterwards, the house was used for the command of the Ustaša Commissioner Jure Francetić during World War II. After the war, the house was commonly known as the Tito's Villa although Yugoslav communist president Josip Broz Tito never stayed there. Devastated by time, the summer house will be rebuilt and renovated as Prince Philip has agreed with local authorities and the Government of Republika Srpska to fund it. According to some sources, the Vidovdan Constitution was signed in the summer house. Furthermore, on 10 February, Prince Philip and his wife met with Milorad Dodik, a Serb member of the Presidency of Bosnia and Herzegovina.

On 21 March 2022, Philip and Princess Danica signed the People's initiative to ban the exploitation of lithium and boron in Serbia.

Hereditary Prince (2022–present) 
 
On 27 April 2022, his elder brother Prince Peter renounced the title of hereditary prince – for himself and his descendants. Philip became Hereditary Prince of Serbia and Yugoslavia, heir apparent to his father Alexander. The ceremony took place at Casa de Pilatos in Seville, Spain, at the presence of his mother Princess Maria da Gloria, his stepfather Duke Ignacio, his wife Danica, his half-sister Countess Sol, Ljubodrag Grujić, a member of the Crown Council, Chancellor of the Orders and the Herald of the House of Karađorđević and Nikola Stanković, Chief of Staff of the Crown Prince. His father, Crown Prince Alexander, did not attend the event. The Crown Prince was dissatisfied with Peter's renunciation. A grandson of King Alexander I of Yugoslavia, Prince Michael, supported the act of renunciation.

On 5 May 2022, Philip and his wife attended mass at Cathedral of Saint-Louis des Invalides in Paris in honor of Napoleon I and soldiers of the Grande Armée who died for France, by a invitation from his cousin Jean-Christophe, Prince Napoléon, a descendant of Napoleon, and his wife Princess Olympia. Afterwards, they have traveled to Mileševa Monastery in southwest Serbia and Pljevlja, Montenegro, attending the Holy Liturgy in Mileševa led by Patriarch Porfirije and Metropolitan Joanikije II of Montenegro and the Littoral.

In the first week of June 2022, Philip and his family traveled to Kosovo, visiting Gazimestan, Gračanica Monastery, Prizren (Church of the Holy Saviour and Monastery of the Holy Archangels), Priština (St. Nicholas Church), and Visoki Dečani Monastery. During his visits, he opened Vidovdanske svečanosti in Gračanica and Spasovdanski dani in Prizren. Furthermore, Prince Philip gave a copy of the Prince Peter's renunciation paper to the library of Visoki Dečani Monastery.

On 11 September 2022, Philip and his wife attended a marching from Loznica to the top of Gučevo mountain in honor of soldiers fallen in the Battle of the Drina in September 1914.

Arms

Ancestry
Philip is a member of the House of Karađorđević. Through his father, Philip descends from kings Nicholas I of Montenegro, Ferdinand I of Romania, Christian IX of Denmark, and Alexander of Greece, and furthermore from emperors Nicholas I of Russia and Frederick III of the Germans and Queen Victoria of the United Kingdom of Great Britain and Ireland. In 2010, several sources reported that he was among the top 100 in the line of succession to the British throne.

Through his mother, Philip descends from the Emperor Pedro II of Brazil, and kings Louis Philippe I of France and Francis I of the Two Sicilies, and furthermore from Francis I, Holy Roman Emperor and king Charles III of Spain.

References

External links
 at the Royal Family of Serbia Official Website

Serbian princes
1982 births
Living people
Alumni of University College London
Karađorđević dynasty
Eastern Orthodox Christians from Serbia
People from Fairfax, Virginia
People educated at The King's School, Canterbury
Serbian expatriates in Spain
Serbian expatriates in the United Kingdom
Serbian people of Danish descent
Serbian people of English descent
Serbian people of German descent
Serbian people of French descent
Serbian people of Portuguese descent
Serbian people of Brazilian descent